Richard Emil Schlesinger (23 September 1900 – 20 January 1968) was an Australian tennis player.

Schlesinger was a two-time runner-up at the Australasian Championships, the future Australian Open, losing to James Anderson in 1924, and to John Colin Gregory in 1929.

Grand Slam finals

Singles: 2 runners-up

References

External links
 
 

Australian male tennis players
1900 births
1968 deaths
Tennis people from Victoria (Australia)
20th-century Australian people